Raya El Hassan (born January 1967) is a Lebanese politician who held the office of the interior and municipalities ministry, and the finance ministry. She is the first woman in Lebanon to be appointed to these and equivalent posts in the government.

Early life and education
El Hassan was born in January 1967 into a Sunni family. She received a bachelor's degree in business administration from the American University of Beirut in June 1987. She then obtained a Master of Business Administration in finance in investments from George Washington University in 1990.

Career
Early in her career, El Hassan worked with Méditerranée Investors Group. She then served as an advisor to the Minister of Economy and Trade and later worked as a member of the Office of the Prime Minister, leading different projects and supervising expenditure management reforms. Subsequently, El Hassan also worked on reforms, elaborating economic and social reform agendas, for the Prime Minister's office.

Prior to her appointment as Finance Minister, she also worked on other administrating programmes under the auspices of the United Nations Development Programme and the World Bank.

Minister of Finance 
El Hassan was appointed Minister of Finance on 9 November 2009, replacing Mohamad Chatah in the post. Her tenure ended in 2011. She was succeeded by Mohammad Safadi.

Minister of Interior and Municipalities 
El Hassan was appointed Minister of Interior and Municipalities on 31 January 2019, replacing Nohad Machnouk in the post. She was succeeded by Mohammed Fahmi in January 2020.

Additional affiliations and memberships 
El Hassan is a member of the March 14 Alliance and an ally of Saad Hariri. In 2016, she served on the advisory board of the Arab Human Development Reports. El Hassan was a member of the board of directors at MedInvestment Bank (BankMed), where she also serves on the audit committee. On 9 Oct. 2020, she was appointed as chairperson of the board of directors of BankMed. She is also the chairman and general manager of the Tripoli Special Economic Zone (TSEZ).

Personal life
El Hassan is married to Janah El Hassan. She has three children.

See also
 Lebanese government of November 2009
 Lebanese Parliament
 Members of the 2009-2013 Lebanese Parliament
 Future Movement

References

External links 

 Raya Haffar El Hassan – Home | Facebook
 Raya Haffar El Hassan (@rayaelhassan) | Twitter

1967 births
Living people
Lebanese Sunni Muslims
Finance ministers of Lebanon
American University of Beirut alumni
George Washington University School of Business alumni
Members of the Parliament of Lebanon
Female finance ministers
21st-century Lebanese women politicians
21st-century Lebanese politicians
People from Tripoli, Lebanon
Women government ministers of Lebanon
Female interior ministers
Future Movement politicians